The 2021 season was the Trent Rockets first season of the new franchise 100 ball cricket, The Hundred.

Players

Men's side 
 Bold denotes players with international caps.

Women's side 
 Bold denotes players with international caps.

Regular season

Fixtures (Men)

July

August

Fixtures (Women)

July

August

Standings

Women

 advances to the Final
 advances to the Eliminator

Men

 advances to the Final
 advances to the Eliminator

Knockout stages

Men

Eliminator

References

Cricket clubs established in 2019
2019 establishments in England
The Hundred (cricket)